Tyler Palmer (born June 22, 1950) is a former American alpine skier who competed in the 1972 Winter Olympics. In the World Cup between March 1970 and December 1971, he achieved four podiums, nine top ten finishes and won two slalom races: 17 January, 1971, at St. Moritz, and 19 December, 1971, at Sestriere. In the 1971 Alpine Skiing World Cup, he finished 10th in the overall standings and 3rd in the slalom.

External links
 sports-reference.com

1950 births
Living people
American male alpine skiers
Olympic alpine skiers of the United States
Alpine skiers at the 1972 Winter Olympics
Sportspeople from New Hampshire
Holderness School alumni